Bishop of Sodor may refer to:

 The pre-Reformation Bishop of the Isles, also known as Bishop of Sodor
 The Church of England Bishop of Sodor and Man